Amélie Goulet-Nadon (born January 24, 1983, in Laval, Quebec) is a Canadian short track speed skater who competed in the 2002 Winter Olympics.

In 2002, she was a member of the Canadian relay team which won the bronze medal in the 3000 metre relay competition. Goulet-Nadon was considered one of Canada's rising superstars in short track until a problem arose with her motor problem, forcing her to abandon the 2006 Turin Olympics and eventually retire early at the age of 23. Her accomplishments include winning the overall 500m, 1000, and 1500m world cups in 2002-03 and finishing second overall in the season. As of 2009, Goulet-Nadon is a graduate in naturopathy who would like to help people incorporate sports and healthy living into their lifestyles. Goulet-Nadon resides in Montreal, Quebec.

External links
 
 Goulet-Nadon article
 

1983 births
Living people
Canadian female short track speed skaters
Olympic short track speed skaters of Canada
Olympic bronze medalists for Canada
Olympic medalists in short track speed skating
Short track speed skaters at the 2002 Winter Olympics
Sportspeople from Laval, Quebec
Medalists at the 2002 Winter Olympics
21st-century Canadian women